Historia regum Britanniae (The History of the Kings of Britain), originally called De gestis Britonum (On the Deeds of the Britons), is a pseudohistorical account of British history, written around 1136 by Geoffrey of Monmouth. It chronicles the lives of the kings of the Britons over the course of two thousand years, beginning with the Trojans founding the British nation and continuing until the Anglo-Saxons assumed control of much of Britain around the 7th century. It is one of the central pieces of the Matter of Britain.

Although taken as historical well into the 16th century, it is now considered to have no value as history. When events described, such as Julius Caesar's invasions of Britain, can be corroborated from contemporary histories, Geoffrey's account can be seen to be wildly inaccurate. It remains, however, a valuable piece of medieval literature, which contains the earliest known version of the story of King Lear and his three daughters, and helped popularise the legend of King Arthur.

Contents

Dedication
Geoffrey starts the book with a statement of his purpose in writing the history: "I have not been able to discover anything at all on the kings who lived here before the Incarnation of Christ, or indeed about Arthur and all the others who followed on after the Incarnation. Yet the deeds of these men were such that they deserve to be praised for all time." He claims that he was given a source for this period by Archdeacon Walter of Oxford, who presented him with a "certain very ancient book written in the British language" from which he has translated his history. He also cites Gildas and Bede as sources. Then follows a dedication to Robert, earl of Gloucester and Waleran, count of Meulan, whom he enjoins to use their knowledge and wisdom to improve his tale.

Book One
The Historia itself begins with the Trojan Aeneas, who, according to the Aeneid of Virgil, settled in Italy after the Trojan War. His great-grandson Brutus is banished, and, after a period of wandering, is directed by the goddess Diana to settle on an island in the western ocean. Brutus lands at Totnes and names the island, then called Albion, "Britain" after himself. Brutus defeats the giants who are the only inhabitants of the island, and establishes his capital, Troia Nova ("New Troy"), on the banks of the Thames; later it is known as Trinovantum, and eventually renamed London.

Book Two
When Brutus dies, his three sons, Locrinus, Kamber and Albanactus, divide the country between themselves; the three kingdoms are named Loegria, Kambria (North and West of the Severn to Humber) and Albany (Scotland). The story then progresses rapidly through the reigns of the descendants of Locrinus, including Bladud, who uses magic and even tries to fly, but dies in the process.

Bladud's son Leir reigns for sixty years. He has no sons, so upon reaching old age he decides to divide his kingdom among his three daughters, Goneril, Regan and Cordelia. To decide who should get the largest share, he asks his daughters how much they love him. Goneril and Regan give extravagant answers, but Cordelia answers simply and sincerely; angered, he gives Cordelia no land. Goneril and Regan are to share half the island with their husbands, the Dukes of Albany and Cornwall. Cordelia marries Aganippus, King of the Franks, and departs for Gaul. Soon Goneril and Regan and their husbands rebel and take the whole kingdom. After Leir has had all his attendants taken from him, he begins to regret his actions towards Cordelia and travels to Gaul. Cordelia receives him compassionately and restores his royal robes and retinue. Aganippus raises a Gaulish army for Leir, who returns to Britain, defeats his sons-in-law and regains the kingdom. Leir rules for three years and then dies; Cordelia inherits the throne and rules for five years before Marganus and Cunedagius, her sisters' sons, rebel against her. They imprison Cordelia; grief-stricken, she kills herself. Marganus and Cunedagius divide the kingdom between themselves, but soon quarrel and go to war with each other. Cunedagius eventually kills Marganus in Wales and retains the whole kingdom, ruling for thirty-three years. He is succeeded by his son Rivallo.

A later descendant of Cunedagius, King Gorboduc, has two sons called Ferreux and Porrex. They quarrel and both are eventually killed, sparking a civil war. This leads to Britain being ruled by five kings, who keep attacking each other. Dunvallo Molmutius, the son of Cloten, the King of Cornwall, becomes pre-eminent. He eventually defeats the other kings and establishes his rule over the whole island. He is said to have "established the so-called Molmutine Laws which are still famous today among the English".

Book Three
Dunvallo's sons, Belinus and Brennius, fight a civil war before being reconciled by their mother, and proceed to sack Rome. Victorious, Brennius remains in Italy, while Belinus returns to rule Britain.

Numerous brief accounts of successive kings follow. These include Lud, who renames Trinovantum "Kaerlud" after himself; this later becomes corrupted to London. Lud is succeeded by his brother, Cassibelanus, as Lud's sons Androgeus and Tenvantius are not yet of age. In recompense, Androgeus is made Duke of Kent and Trinovantum (London), and Tenvantius is made Duke of Cornwall.

Book Four
After his conquest of Gaul, Julius Caesar looks over the sea and resolves to order Britain to swear obedience and pay tribute to Rome. His commands are answered by a letter of refusal from Cassivellaunus. Caesar sails a fleet to Britain, but he is overwhelmed by Cassivellaunus's army and forced to retreat to Gaul. Two years later he makes another attempt, but is again pushed back. Then Cassivellaunus quarrels with one of his dukes, Androgeus, who sends a letter to Caesar asking him to help avenge the duke's honour. Caesar invades once more and besieges Cassivellaunus on a hill. After several days Cassivellaunus offers to make peace with Caesar, and Androgeus, filled with remorse, goes to Caesar to plead with him for mercy. Cassivellaunus pays tribute and makes peace with Caesar, who then returns to Gaul.

Cassivelaunus dies and is succeeded by his nephew Tenvantius, as Androgeus has gone to Rome. Tenvantius is succeeded in turn by his son Kymbelinus, and then Kymbelinus's son Guiderius. Guiderius refuses to pay tribute to emperor Claudius, who then invades Britain. After Guiderius is killed in battle with the Romans, his brother Arvirargus continues the defence, but eventually agrees to submit to Rome, and is given the hand of Claudius's daughter Genvissa in marriage. Claudius returns to Rome, leaving the province under Arviragus's governorship.

The line of British kings continues under Roman rule, and includes Lucius, Britain's first Christian king, and several Roman figures, including the emperor Constantine I, the usurper Allectus and the military commander Asclepiodotus. When Octavius passes the crown to his son-in-law Maximianus, his nephew Conan Meriadoc is given rule of Brittany to compensate him for not succeeding. After a long period of Roman rule, the Romans decide they no longer wish to defend the island and depart. The Britons are immediately besieged by attacks from Picts, Scots and Danes, especially as their numbers have been depleted due to Conan colonizing Brittany and Maximianus using British troops for his campaigns. In desperation the Britons send letters to the general of the Roman forces, asking for help, but receive no reply (this passage borrows heavily from the corresponding section in Gildas' De Excidio et Conquestu Britanniae).

Books Five and Six
After the Romans leave, the Britons ask the King of Brittany (Armorica), descended from Conan, to rule them. However, Aldroenus instead sends his brother Constantine to rule the Britons. After Constantine's death, Vortigern assists his eldest son Constans in succeeding, before enabling their murder and coming to power. Constantine's remaining sons Aurelius Ambrosius and Uther are too young to rule and are taken to safety in Armorica. Vortigern invites the Saxons under Hengist and Horsa to fight for him as mercenaries, but they rise against him. He loses control of much of his land and encounters Merlin.

Book Seven: The Prophecies of Merlin

At this point Geoffrey abruptly pauses his narrative by inserting a series of prophecies attributed to Merlin. Some of the prophecies act as an epitome of upcoming chapters of the Historia, while others are veiled allusions to historical people and events of the Norman world in the 11th–12th centuries. The remainder are obscure.

Book Eight
After Aurelius Ambrosius defeats and kills Vortigern, becoming king, Britain remains in a state of war under him and his brother Uther. They are both assisted by the wizard Merlin. At one point during the continuous string of battles, Ambrosius takes ill and Uther must lead the army for him. This allows an enemy assassin to pose as a physician and poison Ambrosius. When the king dies, a comet taking the form of a dragon's head (pendragon) appears in the night sky, which Merlin interprets as a sign that Ambrosius is dead and that Uther will be victorious and succeed him. So after defeating his latest enemies, Uther adds "Pendragon" to his name and is crowned king.

But another enemy strikes, forcing Uther to make war again. This time he is temporarily defeated, gaining final victory only with the help of Duke Gorlois of Cornwall. But while celebrating this victory with Gorlois, he falls in love with the duke's wife, Igerna. This leads to war between Uther Pendragon and Gorlois of Cornwall, during which Uther clandestinely lies with Igerna through the magic of Merlin. Arthur is conceived that night. Then Gorlois is killed and Uther marries Igerna. But he must war against the Saxons again. Although Uther ultimately triumphs, he dies after drinking water from a spring the Saxons had poisoned.

Books Nine and Ten
Uther's son Arthur assumes the throne and defeats the Saxons so severely that they cease to be a threat until after his death. In the meantime, Arthur conquers most of northern Europe and ushers in a period of peace and prosperity that lasts until the Romans, led by Lucius Hiberius, demands that Britain once again pay tribute to Rome. Arthur defeats Lucius in Gaul, intending to become Emperor, but in his absence, his nephew Mordred seduces and marries Guinevere and seizes the throne.

Books Eleven and Twelve
Arthur returns and kills Mordred at the Battle of Camlann, but, mortally wounded, he is carried off to the isle of Avalon, and hands the kingdom to his cousin Constantine, son of Cador and Duke of Cornwall.

The Saxons returned after Arthur's death, but would not end the line of British kings until the death of Cadwallader. Cadwallader is forced to flee Britain and requests the aid of King Alan of the Amoricans. However an angel's voice tells him the Britons will no longer rule and he should go to Rome. Cadwallader does so, dying there, though leaves his son and nephew to rule the remaining Britons. The remaining Britons are driven into Wales and the Saxon Athelstan becomes King of Loegria.

Sources

Geoffrey claimed to have translated the Historia into Latin from "a very ancient book in the British tongue", given to him by Walter, Archdeacon of Oxford. However, no modern scholars take this claim seriously. Much of the work appears to be derived from Gildas's 6th-century De Excidio et Conquestu Britanniae, Bede's 8th-century Historia ecclesiastica gentis Anglorum, the 9th-century Historia Brittonum ascribed to Nennius, the 10th-century Annales Cambriae, medieval Welsh genealogies (such as the Harleian Genealogies) and king-lists, the poems of Taliesin, the Welsh tale Culhwch and Olwen, and some of the medieval Welsh saints' lives, expanded and turned into a continuous narrative by Geoffrey's own imagination.

Influence
In an exchange of manuscript material for their own histories, Robert of Torigny gave Henry of Huntington a copy of Historia Regum Britanniae, which both Robert and Henry used uncritically as authentic history and subsequently used in their own works, by which means some of Geoffrey's fictions became embedded in popular history. The history of Geoffrey forms the basis for much British lore and literature as well as being a rich source of material for Welsh bards. It became tremendously popular during the High Middle Ages, revolutionising views of British history before and during the Anglo-Saxon period despite the criticism of such writers as William of Newburgh and Gerald of Wales. The prophecies of Merlin in particular were often drawn on in later periods, for instance by both sides in the issue of English influence over Scotland under Edward I and his successors.

The Historia was quickly translated into Norman verse by Wace (the Roman de Brut) in 1155. Wace's version was in turn translated into Middle English verse by Layamon (the Brut) in the early 13th century. In the second quarter of the 13th century, a version in Latin verse, the Gesta Regum Britanniae, was produced by William of Rennes. Material from Geoffrey was incorporated into a large variety of Anglo-Norman and Middle English prose compilations of historical material from the 13th century onward.

Geoffrey was translated into a number of different Welsh prose versions by the end of the 13th century, collectively known as Brut y Brenhinedd. One variant of the Brut y Brenhinedd, the so-called Brut Tysilio, was proposed in 1917 by the archaeologist William Flinders Petrie to be the ancient British book that Geoffrey translated, although the Brut itself claims to have been translated from Latin by Walter of Oxford, based on his own earlier translation from Welsh to Latin. Geoffrey's work is greatly important because it brought the Welsh culture into British society and made it acceptable. It is also the first record we have of the great figure King Lear, and the beginning of the mythical King Arthur figure.

For centuries, the Historia was accepted at face value, and much of its material was incorporated into Holinshed's 16th-century Chronicles. Modern historians have regarded the Historia as a work of fiction with some factual information contained within. John Morris in The Age of Arthur calls it a "deliberate spoof", although this is based on misidentifying Walter, archdeacon of Oxford, as Walter Map, a satirical writer who lived a century later.

It continues to have an influence on popular culture. For example, Mary Stewart's Merlin Trilogy and the TV miniseries Merlin both contain large elements taken from the Historia.

Manuscript tradition and textual history
Two hundred and fifteen medieval manuscripts of the Historia survive, dozens of them copied before the end of the 12th century. Even among the earliest manuscripts a large number of textual variants, such as the so-called "First Variant", can be discerned. These are reflected in the three possible prefaces to the work and in the presence or absence of certain episodes and phrases. Certain variants may be due to "authorial" additions to different early copies, but most probably reflect early attempts to alter, add to or edit the text. Unfortunately, the task of disentangling these variants and establishing Geoffrey's original text is long and complex, and the extent of the difficulties surrounding the text has been established only recently.

The variant title Historia regum Britanniae was introduced in the Middle Ages, and this became the most common form in the modern period. A critical edition of the work published in 2007, however, demonstrated that the most accurate manuscripts refer to the work as De gestis Britonum, and that this was the title Geoffrey himself used to refer to the work.

See also
 List of legendary kings of Britain

References

Bibliography
 John Jay Parry and Robert Caldwell. "Geoffrey of Monmouth" in Arthurian Literature in the Middle Ages, Roger S. Loomis (ed.). Oxford: Clarendon Press. 1959. 72–93. 
 Brynley F. Roberts. "Geoffrey of Monmouth and Welsh Historical Tradition," Nottingham Medieval Studies, 20 (1976), 29–40.
 J. S. P. Tatlock. The Legendary History of Britain: Geoffrey of Monmouth's Historia Regum Britanniae and Its Early Vernacular Versions. Berkeley: University of California Press, 1950.
 Michael A. Faletra, trans. and ed. The History of the Kings of Britain. Geoffrey of Monmouth. Peterborough, Ont.; Plymouth: Broadview Editions, 2008.
 N. Wright, ed. The Historia Regum Britannie of Geoffrey of Monmouth. 1, A Single-Manuscript Edition from Bern, Burgerbibliothek, MS. 568. Cambridge: D. S. Brewer, 1984.
 N. Wright, ed. The Historia Regum Britannie of Geoffrey of Monmouth. 2, The First Variant Version: A Critical Edition. Cambridge: D. S. Brewer, 1988.
 J. C. Crick. The Historia Regum Britannie of Geoffrey of Monmouth. 3, A Summary Catalogue of the Manuscripts. Cambridge: D. S. Brewer, 1989.
 J. C. Crick. The Historia Regum Britannie of Geoffrey of Monmouth. 4, Dissemination and Reception in the Later Middle Ages. Cambridge: D. S. Brewer, 1991.
 J. Hammer, ed. Historia Regum Britanniae: A Variant Version Edited from Manuscripts. Cambridge, MA: 1951.
 A. Griscom, ed., and J. R. Ellis, trans. The Historia Regum Britanniae of Geoffrey of Monmouth with Contributions to the Study of its Place in Early British History. London: Longmans, Green and Co., 1929.
 
 M. D. Reeve, "The Transmission of the Historia Regum Britanniae," Journal of Medieval Latin 1 (1991), 73–117.
 Edmond Faral. La Légende arthurienne. Études et documents, 3 vols. Bibliothèque de l'École des Hautes Études. Paris, 1929.
 R. W. Leckie. The Passage of Dominion. Geoffrey of Monmouth and the Periodization of Insular History in the Twelfth Century. Toronto: Toronto University Press, 1981.

External links
 
 
 Online text at Google Books
 Online Latin text at Google Books
 Historia regum Britanniae Second Variant version at Cambridge Digital Library
 

1130s books
12th century in Great Britain
12th-century Latin books
Arthurian literature in Latin
British traditional history
Latin historical texts from Norman and Angevin England
King lists
Medieval Latin historical texts
Medieval Welsh literature
Pseudohistory
Works by Geoffrey of Monmouth
Depictions of Julius Caesar in literature